The Koç family is a Turkish family of business people founded by Vehbi Koç, one of the wealthiest self-made people in Turkey. His grandsons, the third generation of the Koç family, today run Turkey's largest group of companies, Koç Holding, the only Turkish company on the Fortune Global 500 list.  In 2016, the family's wealth was estimated at US$8 billion, ranking them as the wealthiest family in Turkey. According to Murat Bardakçı, their lineage can be traced to Hacı Bayram-ı Veli.

Notable family members
 Vehbi Koç was born on July 20, 1901, in Ankara and died on February 25, 1996, in İstanbul. In 1926, he married Sadberk, his maternal cousin. Starting in trade at a very young age, he built up a broad net of companies, and founded Koç Holding in 1963. He became the richest person in Turkey. His son Rahmi Mustafa Koç and his three daughters, Semahat, Sevgi and Suna, succeeded him.
 Semahat Sevim Koç, born 1928 in Ankara, is the first child of Vehbi Koç. She graduated from the American College for Girls in Istanbul before studying at the Goethe Institute in Germany. She was married to Dr. Nusret Arsel from 1956 until his death in 2014. Semahat is member of the board directors of Koç Holding and the Koç Foundation. She is president of the Semahat Arsel Nursing Education and Research Center.
 Rahmi Mustafa Koç (born 1930 in Ankara) received his BA degree from Johns Hopkins University, US, after graduating from Robert College in İstanbul. He served at various managerial posts in the group companies, and in 1984 took over the leadership of the business empire his father had founded. Rahmi married Çiğdem Meseretçioğlu, but the couple ultimately divorced after their three sons were born. In 2003, he transferred his chair to his eldest son Mustafa, and assumed the title of honorary chairman of Koç Holding.
 Mustafa Vehbi Koç, born 1960 in İstanbul, was the eldest son of Rahmi Koç. He died on January 21, 2016, following a heart attack. He was educated in the Lyceum Alpinum Zuoz in Switzerland, and graduated in 1984 from  George Washington University, US. After serving at various posts, this third generation member of the family was appointed president of Koç Holding in 2003. He was married to Caroline Giraud, the daughter of a renowned Levantine family from İzmir.
 Mehmet Ömer Koç was born on March 24, 1962, in Ankara as the second son of Rahmi Koç. He graduated from Robert College in İstanbul and Millfield School in Somerset, UK. Ömer was educated first at the Georgetown University, Washington D.C., and then obtained his BA and master's degree from Columbia University, New York. After working in several posts in the Koç group companies, he is currently chairman of Koc Holding, replacing his brother Mustafa, who died in 2016.
 Ali Yıldırım Koç (born April 2, 1967, in İstanbul) is the youngest son of Rahmi Koç. After finishing high school at Harrow School, London, he received  his B.A. in 1989 from Rice University, Houston, Texas, followed by his Master's degree from Harvard University in 1997. After working in various companies in the US and in the Koç Group, he became chief executive of Koç Holding's information technologies group. He recently married Nevbahar Demirağ. He is the elected chairman of the Turkish sports club Fenerbahçe SK.
 Sevgi Koç was born 1938 as the third child of Vehbi Koç. She graduated from the American College for Girls in Istanbul and married Erdoğan Gönül, a member of the Koç Holding's board of directors. She was also made a member of the board of directors for both Koç Holding and the Vehbi Koç Foundation. Sevgi also presided over the executive committee of the Sadberk Hanim Museum in İstanbul, and was a columnist in the Turkish newspaper Hürriyet. She died in İstanbul from cancer on September 12, 2003, shortly after her husband.
 Suna Koç was born in 1941 and died in 2020. She was the fourth child of Vehbi Koç. She graduated from American College for Girls in Istanbul, and was then educated at the Boğaziçi University, İstanbul. She was married to İnan Kıraç, a high-ranking executive of the Koç Group. They have one child. Suna had served in various posts in the holding, most notably as vice president. She was also a board member of various foundations and educational institutions. Due to her contributions in education, health and social service in Turkey, Suna was awarded the Supreme Service Medal by state president Süleyman Demirel in 1997. In 1999, the London Business School granted her honorary membership for her contributions in leadership at the Koç Holding and in field of children's education in Turkey.

See also
 American Hospital, Istanbul
 Pera Museum
 Rahmi M Koç Museum
 Koç Holding
 Koç School
 Koç University
 Vehbi Koç Foundation

References

 
Turkish business families
Turkish billionaires